Joseph Vasold (born August 13, 1984) is a lacrosse player who was drafted by the San Jose Stealth in the 5th Round (55th Overall), during the 2006 NLL Draft. He was also supplementally drafted to the MLL, in 2007, by the San Francisco Dragons. His collegiate career was played at NYIT. As a senior, Vasold earned first team honors on the 2006 STX/USILA All-American teams. He was given STX/USILA Geico Honorable Mention All-American honors and NYCAC Second-Team All-Conference honors as a junior in 2005.

References

1984 births
Living people
American lacrosse players
NYIT Bears men's lacrosse players
Major League Lacrosse players
People from Levittown, New York
San Jose Stealth players
Sportspeople from New York (state)